Universal Law College is a private law school situated beside the Ambala Chandigarh Expressway at Mohali Lalru in the Indian state of Punjab. It offers undergraduate 3 years law courses and a 5-year integrated B.A. LL.B. It is approved by the Bar Council of India New Delhi and affiliated to Punjabi University.

History
Universal Law College was established in 2016 by Universal Group of Institutions, in Chandigarh, Mohali, Punjab.

References

Law schools in Punjab, India
Education in Mohali
Educational institutions established in 2016
2016 establishments in Punjab, India